David J. Schwartz (born September 22, 1970) is an American science fiction and fantasy writer, whose novel Superpowers was a finalist for the Nebula Award. Schwartz is also author of the Kindle Serial Gooseberry Bluff Community College of Magic: The Thirteenth Rib.

Bibliography

Short fiction

References

External links
David J. Schwartz News, the author's official site. Includes his blog and bibliography.

 Gooseberry Bluff Community College of Magic: The Thirteenth Rib at Amazon

21st-century American novelists
American fantasy writers
American male novelists
American science fiction writers
Magic realism writers
Postmodern writers
Living people
1970 births
Place of birth missing (living people)
American male short story writers
21st-century American short story writers
21st-century American male writers